Bou Qobrine may refer to:

Sidi M'hamed Bou Qobrine, an Algerian theologian and Sufi
Sidi M'hamed Bou Qobrine, a municipality in Algiers Province
Sidi M'hamed Bou Qobrine Cemetery, a cemetery in Algiers Province
Sidi M'hamed Bou Qobrine District, a district in Algiers Province